Arthur Hobbs (born 1940) is an American mathematician specializing in graph theory. He spent his teaching career at Texas A&M University.

Early and personal life
Arthur Hobbs was born on June 19, 1940, in Washington, D.C. He is the eldest child of his family, having two younger brothers. His father was an engineer and later became an attorney. The family moved in 1941 to Pennsylvania, and again after World War II to South Bend, Indiana, where Arthur Hobbs grew up. He married his wife Barbara in 1964; they have two daughters and five grandchildren.

Education and early career

After graduating in 1958 from John Adams High School, Hobbs studied mathematics at the University of Michigan, graduating in 1962. He then served in the US Army in Washington, D.C., for approximately two years, and then from 1965 to 1968 worked for the National Bureau of Standards.

He received his Ph.D. from the University of Waterloo in Ontario, Canada, in 1971. His research focused on Hamiltonian cycles, particularly concentrating in squares and higher powers of graphs, and his thesis adviser was the graph theorist William Thomas Tutte.

Academic career
After receiving his Ph.D., Hobbs began teaching as a mathematics professor at Texas A&M University in 1971, where he worked until his retirement in 2008. He was the faculty senator for twelve years, and also taught various mathematics courses including, but not limited to calculus, combinatorics, discrete mathematics, graph theory, and number theory. Hobbs and his colleague taught a course in the intersection of graph theory and number theory, he explains:

Research
Hobbs' research before entering graduate school was on thickness of graphs. Later, in graduate school and for ten years following, he concentrated on Hamiltonian cycles, particularly in squares and higher powers of graphs. He then spent a couple of years working on the Gyarfas and Lehel conjecture that any family of trees T1; T2; : : : Tn, with 1; 2; : : : ; n vertices respectively, can be packed in an edge-disjoint manner into the complete graph on n vertices. This conjecture is still open. Hobbs has also worked with packings of graphs with trees and coverings by trees, which he worked on with several co-authors, including Paul A. Catlin, Jerrold W. Grossman, Lavanya Kannan, and Hong-Jian Lai.

They defined the fractional arboricity of a graph as

 

where ω(H is the number of components of H and the maximum is taken over all subgraphs H for which the denominator is not zero. They also defined the strength of a graph as

 

where the maximum is taken over all subsets S of E(G) for which the denominator is not zero. Additionally, they characterized uniformly dense graphs, and have found several classes of uniformly dense graphs and several ways of constructing such graphs.

Hobbs has also done research in matroid theory.

Publications
Dr. Hobbs has 40 publications in graph theory, and in 1989 co-authored the book Elementary Linear Algebra. He has also written an essay on how to read research papers. A few publications are listed below:

 Hobbs, Arthur M.; Kannan, Lavanya; Lai, Hong-Jian; Lai, Hongyuan; Weng, Guoqing Balanced and 1-balanced graph constructions. Discrete Appl. Math. 158 (2010), no. 14, 1511–1523.
 Fleischner, Herbert; Hobbs, Arthur M.; Tapfuma Muzheve, Michael Hamiltonicity in vertex envelopes of plane cubic graphs. Discrete Math. 309 (2009), no. 14, 4793–4809.
 Kannan, Lavanya; Hobbs, Arthur; Lai, Hong-Jian; Lai, Hongyuan Transforming a graph into a 1-balanced graph. Discrete Appl. Math. 157 (2009), no. 2, 300–308
 A. M. Hobbs, H.-J. Lai, H. Lai, and G. Weng, Constructing Uniformly Dense Graphs, preprint, October 1, 1994

References

External links
Arthur Hobbs, Texas A&M University

1940 births
Living people
People from Washington, D.C.
University of Michigan College of Literature, Science, and the Arts alumni
20th-century American mathematicians
21st-century American mathematicians
Graph theorists